Raphiocarpus is a genus of flowering plants belonging to the family Gesneriaceae.

Its native range is Southern China to Vietnam.

Species:

Raphiocarpus annamensis 
Raphiocarpus asper 
Raphiocarpus aureus 
Raphiocarpus begoniifolius 
Raphiocarpus clemensiae 
Raphiocarpus evrardii 
Raphiocarpus jinpingensis 
Raphiocarpus longipedunculatus 
Raphiocarpus macrosiphon 
Raphiocarpus maguanensis 
Raphiocarpus petelotii 
Raphiocarpus sesquifolius 
Raphiocarpus sinicus 
Raphiocarpus tamdaoensis

References

Didymocarpoideae
Gesneriaceae genera